Frederick J. Eikerenkoetter II, better known as Reverend Ike (June 1, 1935 – July 28, 2009), was an American minister and evangelist based in New York City. He was known for the slogan "You can't lose with the stuff I use!"  Though his preaching is considered a form of prosperity theology, Rev. Ike diverged from traditional Christian theology and taught what he called "Science of Living."

Life and career
Frederick J. Eikerenkoetter II was born in Ridgeland, South Carolina to parents from the Netherlands Antilles, and was of African  and Indo (Dutch-Indonesian) descent. He began his career as a teenage preacher and became assistant pastor at Bible Way Church in Ridgeland, South Carolina. After serving a stint in the Air Force as a Chaplain Service Specialist (a non-commissioned officer assigned to assist commissioned Air Force chaplains), he founded, successively, the United Church of Jesus Christ for All People in Beaufort, South Carolina, the United Christian Evangelistic Association in Boston, Massachusetts, his main corporate entity, and the Christ Community United Church in New York City. 

Known popularly as "Reverend Ike," his ministry reached its peak in the mid 1970s, when his weekly radio sermons were carried by hundreds of stations across the United States. He was famous for his "Blessing Plan" – radio listeners sent him money and in return he blessed them. He said radio listeners who did this would become more prosperous. He was criticized for his overt interest in financial remuneration.  In 1972, The New York Times described his church service:

Rev. Ike bought the Loew's 175th Street Theatre movie palace in the Washington Heights neighborhood for over half a million dollars, renamed it the "Palace Cathedral" – although colloquially it was known as "Reverend Ike's Prayer Tower" – and had it fully restored. Restorations included the seven-story high, twin chamber Robert Morton organ. The "Miracle Star of Faith", visible from the George Washington Bridge, tops the building's cupola. In 2016, the building was designated as a landmark by the New York City Landmark Commission.

Rev. Ike  was also the "chancellor" of the United Church Schools, including the Science of Living Institute and Seminary (which awarded him, his wife, and his son Doctor of the Science of Living degrees); the Business of Living Institute (home of Thinkonomics); and other educational projects.

Other activities
Ike made a guest appearance on Hank Williams, Jr.'s single “Mind Your Own Business”, a Number One country music hit in December 1986. This song is Reverend Ike's only chart single.

In pop culture

In December 2005, John Lennon and Yoko Ono's personal assistant May Pang told Radio Times:

Family and death
Ike and his wife, Eula M. Dent, had one son, Xavier Eikerenkoetter. Reverend Ike died in Los Angeles at age 74 on July 28, 2009, after not fully recovering from a stroke in 2007. His son gave a eulogy at his father's memorial service  comparing his father to Martin Luther King and Malcolm X – as a "spiritual activist" and a liberator of minds. Xavier subsequently took over the church.

References

External links
 Science of Living Online
 Rev. Ike Ministries

1935 births
2009 deaths
African-American television personalities
American television evangelists
American people of Dutch-Indonesian descent
People from Ridgeland, South Carolina
United States Air Force airmen
Prosperity theologians
20th-century African-American people
21st-century African-American people